Imamović is a Bosniak surname. It may refer to:

Ahmed Imamović (born 1971), Bosnian film director
Armin Imamović (born 2000), Bosnian footballer
Damir Imamović (born 1978), Bosnian musician
Enis Imamović (born 1984), Bosniak politician in Serbia
Jasmin Imamović (born 1957), writer and politician from Bosnia and Herzegovina
Mustafa Imamović (1941–2017), Bosnian historian
Nusret Imamović (born 1971), Bosnian Islamist leader
Zaim Imamović (musician) (1920–1994), Bosnian popular sevdalinka performer
Zaim Imamović (officer) (1961–1995), Bosniak soldier, commanded the Army of Bosnia and Herzegovina during the 1992–1995 war

Bosnian surnames

de:Imamović